Hungladder is a small village on north west coast of the Trotternish peninsula  in Kilmuir, Portree, Isle of Skye, Scottish Highlands and is in the Scottish council area of Highland. The village of Uig, lies 5 miles to the south.

References

Populated places in the Isle of Skye